Floyd Manderson (born 5 March 1961) is a British athlete. He competed in the men's high jump at the 1988 Summer Olympics.

References

External links
 

1961 births
Living people
Athletes (track and field) at the 1988 Summer Olympics
British male high jumpers
Olympic athletes of Great Britain
Athletes (track and field) at the 1986 Commonwealth Games
Commonwealth Games competitors for Northern Ireland
Male athletes from Northern Ireland
Irish male high jumpers
People from Camberwell
Athletes from London